Zhiyuan Temple may refer to:

 Zhiyuan Temple (Mount Jiuhua), on Mount Jiuhua, in Qingyang County, Anhui, China
 Zhiyuan Temple (Panjin), in Panjin, Liaoning, China

Buddhist temple disambiguation pages